Dichogama innocua is a moth in the family Crambidae. It was described by Johan Christian Fabricius in 1793. It is found in South America and on the Antilles. It has also been recorded from Costa Rica.

The wingspan is about 26 mm.

References

Moths described in 1793
Dichogamini